Bergen Aquarium is a public aquarium in Bergen, Norway. It is situated on the Nordnes peninsula  and is one of Bergen's tourist attractions.

History
When it opened on 27 August 1960, it was considered to be the largest and most modern aquarium in Northern Europe.
The buildings were designed by architects Hans Chr. Gaaserud and Helge Simers in 1952. Architect Ola B. Åsness was attached to the project during the construction phase.  Gunnar Rollefsen designed the interior. Construction in 1995 included the addition of a movie theater.

Exhibits
Bergen Aquarium features more than 300 species. The complex houses over 60 tanks of fish, marine invertebrates, as well as three outdoor ponds with seals, penguins and cyprinids and a tropical branch with reptiles and monkeys.

References

Other sources

Welle-Strand, Erling (1974)  Museums in Norway (Oslo: Royal Ministry of Foreign Affairs)  .

External links
Akvariet i Bergen official website

Buildings and structures in Bergen
Zoos in Norway
1960 establishments in Norway
Aquaria in Norway
Tourist attractions in Bergen